"Cecilia" is a song by American musical duo Simon & Garfunkel. It was released in April 1970 as the third single from the group's fifth studio album, Bridge over Troubled Water (1970). Written by Paul Simon, the song's origins lie in a late-night party, in which the duo and friends began banging on a piano bench. They recorded the sound with a tape recorder, employing reverb and matching the rhythm created by the machine. Simon later wrote the song's guitar line and lyrics on the subject of an untrustworthy lover.

The song was a hit single in the United States, peaking at number four on the Billboard Hot 100. On the Cash Box Top 100, it reached number one.

"Cecilia" also did well in Canada, Germany, the Netherlands, and Spain, where it reached number two, and also in Switzerland and Belgium, where it peaked at number three, although it failed to chart in the United Kingdom, where it was released as a single about six months after the album. It has been the subject of numerous cover versions, most notably by the singer Suggs, whose version featured the  ragga duo, Louchie Lou & Michie One and reached number four in the United Kingdom in 1996.

Background and recording
The song's origins lie in a late-night party attended by the duo and friends. The song's rhythm was developed by Simon, Garfunkel, and Simon's younger brother, Eddie. They recorded it for fun utilizing a Sony tape recorder and employing reverberation. In doing so, they were able to synchronize their live rhythm with the reverberating sound on the recording. A friend grabbed a guitar, strumming and punctuating the rhythm with "aahs".

Simon later found himself coming back to the tape and its infectious quality. While listening to the recording, he composed the song's guitar line. Simon found a section, the length of shortly over a minute, that he felt had a nice groove. He and producer Roy Halee made a loop of this section, which was not an easy task before the advent of digital recording. The duo later recorded additional elements of the song at Columbia Records' Gower Street location in Hollywood, typically used for string section recording. Simon & Garfunkel dropped drumsticks on the parquet floor, incorporating their sound into the track. In addition, Simon played random notes on a xylophone, as those elements would be compressed in the final version to where it would not be audible whether or not they were correctly played. Drums were played by veteran Wrecking Crew drummer Hal Blaine.

The lyric "making love in the afternoon" was among Simon's most explicit at the time. Simon states in the 2011 documentary The Harmony Game that, during the song's initial success, he came upon a recently returned Vietnam War veteran. The man told Simon that soldiers heard the song and found it a sign of the country's changing mores.

In 2008, Stephen Colbert facetiously asked Simon why the narrator of the song would need to get up and wash his face after making love. Simon replied, "Well, it's the '60s, so I can't remember."

Composition
Simon has suggested that the "Cecilia" of the title refers to St. Cecilia, patron saint of music in the Catholic tradition, and thus the song might refer to the frustration of fleeting inspiration in songwriting, the vagaries of musical fame or in a wider sense the absurdity of pop culture. The song is generally interpreted as a lament over a capricious lover who causes both anguish and jubilation to the singer. St. Cecilia is mentioned in another Paul Simon song, "The Coast" (from his 1990 album The Rhythm of the Saints): "A family of musicians took shelter for the night in the little harbor church of St. Cecilia."

Release and charts
Simon & Garfunkel initially imagined "Cecilia" to be the first real single from Bridge over Troubled Water, following an early release of "The Boxer" in April 1969. Columbia Records chairman Clive Davis instead pressed the duo to instead issue the title track as the lead single.

Cash Box described "Cecilia" as a "mixture of rhythm-chant vigor and Caribbean-rock excitement."  The song topped the Cash Box Top 100 in May 1970. The song peaked at number 4 on the Billboard Hot 100, spending 13 weeks on the chart. It also hit number 32 on the magazine's  Easy Listening chart.

The single did not chart in the UK, despite being released as the follow-up to Simon and Garfunkel's number 1 hit "Bridge over Troubled Water", and most copies of the UK single misspelled the title as "Cecelia" on the label.

Charts

Weekly charts
{|class="wikitable sortable plainrowheaders" style="text-align:center"
!Chart (1970)
!Peakposition
|-
!scope="row"|Australia (Kent Music Report)
|6
|-

|-

|-

|-

|-

|-

|-
!scope="row"|Rhodesia (ZIMA)
|19
|-
!scope="row"|Spain (IFPI Spain) 
|2
|-

|-

|-
!scope="row"|US Billboard Easy Listening
|31
|-
!scope="row"|US Cash Box Top 100
|1
|-

|}

Year-end charts

Certifications

Suggs version

In 1994, English singer Suggs went to work on his first solo project with producers Sly and Robbie, who suggested "Cecilia" as one of the songs to work on. Sly and Robbie had previously worked with the English ragga duo Louchie Lou & Michie One on "Shout", and they brought the duo in on the recording.  "Cecilia" appears on Suggs' debut solo album, The Lone Ranger released in 1995, and the song was released in April 1996 as the fourth single from the album. The song became the most successful single for both Suggs and Louchie Lou & Michie One, reaching number four on the UK Singles Chart.

Charts
Weekly charts

Year-end charts

Certifications

Other versions
In 1970, a cover version was released in 1970 by UK group Harmony Grass, which did not chart.  French-speaking American musician Joe Dassin sang a French version of this song, titled "Cécilia", in 1970, while in February 1971, a version was released in England by the New Wave Band (a group that comprised three members of the band that would soon become 10cc) and Herman's Hermits guitarist Derek Leckenby. It did not chart.
In 1971, a cover version was recorded by the Serbian and former Yugoslav acoustic music duo Vlada i Bajka.
In 1971, a cover version was released by Motown's Smokey Robinson and The Miracles on their album One Dozen Roses.
The Coolies cover it on their 1986 album dig..?, along with eight other tongue-in-cheek covers of Simon & Garfunkel classics.
In 1984, German Singer Mike Mareen released a Euro Disco Cover of the Song on his Night N Day Label.
In 1988, a cover version by California-based dance duo Times Two was released, peaking at number 79 on the Billboard Hot 100 in July 1988.
Glass Eye covered the song in 1988 on their album ‘’Bent by Nature’’.
In 1991, the Spanish duo Dúo Dinámico released the Spanish version of Cecilia for their album Tal cual.
In 1993, the British version of the ABBA tribute performers Björn Again recorded a cover for their album Flashback.
In 1998, the euroreggae project Pandera from Germany did a cover version and released it as a single and later on their 3rd album Sun Splash Summerdance & Freestyle In 2009, guitarist Jesse Cook did a cover version of the song on his album, The Rumba Foundation. It featured Jeremy Fisher on vocals.
 In 2009, Indie rock band Local Natives covered the song.
 In 2010, the song was covered on Gaelic Storm's album Cabbage, which was released on August of that year.
In 2014, The Vamps' debut album, Meet The Vamps, featured an adaptation of the song as "Oh Cecilia (Breaking My Heart)".
In 2015, the song was covered by the Country and Irish singer Derek Ryan in his studio album One Good Night coupled with a music video of live performances by Ryan.

Live cover performances
The song was performed on April 6, 2011 on Late Night with Jimmy Fallon by Simon accompanied by Fallon and the cast of Stomp.

Charts (Times Two version)

Weekly charts

Year-end charts

References in other songs
 Faith No More's song "Midlife Crisis", from their 1992 album Angel Dust, features a sample of the first measure of "Cecilia" repeated throughout the song as part of the percussion track.
 In 1998, Swedish pop band Ace of Base released a Europop track titled "Cecilia" from their album Flowers, which continues the story of Paul Simon's character. Jenny Berggren, lead vocalist for the band, sings, "This is a song about a well-known girl", then tells of Cecilia's continuous bouncing back and forth between lovers.
The 2012 single "Some Nights" by indie pop group fun. was noted for its similarities to "Cecilia".
 British band The Vamps sampled the song's chorus in their own song entitled "Oh Cecilia (Breaking My Heart)". It can be found on their debut album Meet the Vamps'', released on April 14, 2014. It also served as their fifth single featuring additional vocals by Canadian singer Shawn Mendes.

References

Bibliography

 
 

1969 songs
1970 singles
1988 singles
1996 singles
Columbia Records singles
Joe Dassin songs
Cashbox number-one singles
Number-one singles in New Zealand
Simon & Garfunkel songs
Song recordings produced by Art Garfunkel
Song recordings produced by Paul Simon
Song recordings produced by Roy Halee
Song recordings produced by Sly & Robbie
Songs written by Paul Simon
Suggs (singer) songs
Warner Music Group singles